Rakke is a small borough in Väike-Maarja Parish, Lääne-Viru County, Estonia. Rakke has a population of 1015.

Before the 2017 Administrative Reform, Rakke was the administrative centre of Rakke Parish.

Notable people
Õnne Kurg (born 1973), cross-country skier, born in Rakke
Hugo Raudsepp (1883–1952), writer, worked in Rakke in his youth
Marta Sillaots (1887–1969), writer, translator, and literary critic, born in Rakke

References

Boroughs and small boroughs in Estonia